Evgeniia Igorevna Chikunova (born 17 November 2004) is a Russian swimmer. She competed in the women's 100 metre breaststroke, 200 metre breaststroke, and 4 × 100 metre medley relay at the 2020 Summer Olympics.

In 2019 she broke the junior world record for the 200 metre breaststroke (short course) with a time of 2:17.71 and broke her own record twice in 2021 with a time of 2:17.57 and then 2:16.88.

References

External links
 

2004 births
Living people
Russian female breaststroke swimmers
Swimmers from Saint Petersburg
Olympic swimmers of Russia
Swimmers at the 2020 Summer Olympics
European Aquatics Championships medalists in swimming
Medalists at the FINA World Swimming Championships (25 m)
21st-century Russian women